Kudowa-Zdrój , or simply Kudowa, is a town located below the Table Mountains in Kłodzko County, Lower Silesian Voivodeship, in the southwestern part of Poland.

Kudowa-Zdrój is one of the oldest European spa towns where heart and circulatory system diseases were cured. The downtown area features a park styled on 17th century revival, with exotic plants and a mineral water pump room. Due to its location, the town is famous for tourism, hiking and as the departure point for trips.

The town has several historical and heritage sites such as the Chapel of Skulls within the Czermna district of Kudowa, an ossuary containing the bones or skeletal remains of thousands. It is one of six of its kind in Europe. Another site is the Basilica of Wambierzyce, nicknamed "Silesian Jerusalem", and one of the most popular Catholic pilgrimage destinations in Poland.

History

Kudowa-Zdrój is one of the oldest spa resorts in Poland and Europe. It is first mentioned in a document by Henry the Elder (1448-1498), son of the Hussite Czech king George of Podebrady.  The original name of the village was Lipolitov but in the mid-16th century it was changed to Chudoba, later on Kudoba (Cudoba in the 19th century), Bad Kudowa and into Kudowa-Zdrój in 1945.

The oldest part of Kudowa is Czermna, dating back to the 16th century. The first record of a mineral waters in the area comes from 1580 from the chronicles of Louis of Náchod, under the name Cermenske Lazne. In 1625 (or, as some sources say, as early as 1621), G. Aelurius, a Protestant Lutheran monk, wrote in his work "Glaciografia" about the great taste of the mineral waters from Kudowa.

In 1847, Kudowa was visited by 300 patients. In 1850, Adolf Duflos made a chemical analysis of the local waters and claimed they have healing traits. Local doctor J. Jacob helped to establish the notion that Kudowa is a spa that helps heart related diseases, which had a significant impact on the number of people visiting the town. In 1900, the number of people who visited was 4,150.

Owing to the development of business and industry, a railway line to Kłodzko (then under the name Glatz) and a local power plant grew in importance.

In 1891, German-American editor Hermann Raster visited Kudowa-Zdrój due to failing health. He died there in July of that same year.

In 1920, the Gebrüder Martin und Paul Polka O.H.G. company bought the largest spa resort of the town. Famous visitors included Winston Churchill and 
Helmut von Moltke. From 1911 to 1931, Raphael Friedeberg worked as a physician in the Spa.

Kudowa was part of Bohemia until 1742 when, together with the rest of the county of Kladsko, it passed to Prussia. From 1818 until 1945, it was known as Bad Kudowa, and was part of the Prussian province of Lower Silesia. Between 1871 and 1945 it was part of Germany. In the interbellum, the German administration renamed most district names to erase traces of Slavic origin, only the district of Zakrze (then under the Germanized name Sackisch) retained its name, despite also being of Slavic origin.

During World War II, the Germans established and operated a subcamp of the Gross-Rosen concentration camp for Jewish women in the Zakrze district, as well as other forced labour camps, among the prisoners of which were also Italian prisoners of war.

The story of Italian soldier  is known. Despite risk Baldan was able to help Jewish women by giving them food, which he in turn received from Poles and Czechs, and he also escaped the camp and hid from Germans with the help of the Czechs.

After Nazi Germany's defeat in World War II in 1945, most German inhabitants were expelled and Kudowa was repopulated with Polish settlers, most of whom were themselves expelled from former Eastern Poland, annexed by the Soviet Union. After becoming part of Poland it received municipal rights for the first time in its history.

As the area was a part of the Czech Corner of Kłodzko Land, a population of ethnic Czechs lived in Kudowa-Zdrój (then Bad Kudowa) before 1945. Small groups of Germans and Czechs continued to live in Kudowa until 1960. A German-speaking school was used from 1951 to 1960, and a Czech-speaking school was used from 1947 to 1955 by these small groups. Refugees of the Greek Civil War also settled in the town, as they found employment in the Zakrze textile factory.

Since 1962, Kudowa-Zdrój hosts the annual International Moniuszko Festival, dedicated to the "father of Polish national opera" Stanisław Moniuszko.

Subdivisions

(with German names)
 Brzozowie (Brzesowie, 1924–45: Birkhagen)
 Bukowina Kłodzka (Bukowine, 1937–45: Tannhübel)
 Czermna (Tscherbeney, 1937–45: Grenzeck)
 Jakubowice (Jakobowitz, 1937–45: Wachtgrund)
 Pstrążna (Straußeney, 1937–45: Straußdörfel)
 Słone (Schlaney, 1937–45: Schnellau)
 Zakrze (Sackisch)

Sports
The local football club is Włókniarz Kudowa-Zdrój. It competes in the lower leagues.

Twin towns – sister cities

Kudowa-Zdrój is twinned with:
 Horn-Bad Meinberg, Germany
 Hronov, Czech Republic
 Náchod, Czech Republic
 Tuchola, Poland

Gallery

References

External links

 Official website
 Jewish Community in Kudowa-Zdrój on Virtual Shtetl
 Kudowa-Zdrój on Map
 Kudowa-Zdrój – photo gallery

Spa towns in Poland
Cities and towns in Lower Silesian Voivodeship
Kudowa Zdroj
Cities in Silesia
Czech Republic–Poland border crossings